The Scorch of Rage is the debut album by Greek groove metal band Bewized, released on 25 April 2011, through Casket Music. It was recorded at Noise Factory Studios by Christian Rahm, mixed and mastered by Fotis Demertzis at Mix Studios (Thessaloniki, Greece).

Track listing

Personnel
 Paschalis Theotokis – lead vocals, guitar
 Orestis Georgiadis – lead guitar
 Pantazis Theotokis – bass
 Kostis Tatsis – drums

References

Bewized albums
2011 debut albums